City University of Macau (CityU;) is a private university in Taipa, Macao, China. It was established in 1981 as the University of East Asia. It was renamed as Asia International Open University (Macau) in 1992.  The university offers doctorate, master, bachelor's degree programmes and pre-university study courses.

The university is ranked 89th place in the "Ranking of Top Universities in Greater China" by Academic Ranking of World Universities (Also known as ShanghaiRanking) in the year of 2020. According to the subject ranking of the Academic Ranking of World Universities released in 2022, the City University of Macau was ranked in the range of 51-75 worldwide in the subject hospitality and tourism management.

Campus
The university was located in a commercial complex called Royal Center Building on Avenida do Dr. Rodrigo Rodrigues. In 2015, the university headquarters moved back to the original site of University of Macau. The Taipa Campus is located in the heart of the South China Sea, the Pearl River and Macao. It is a comprehensive University located on the highest altitude in Macao.

Degree programmes

CityU Macau is the cradle of application-oriented and versatile graduates with international visions. It currently offers over 40 Chinese-, English- and Portuguese-medium programmes to 8,500+ students through nine faculties:

Bachelor's Degree Programmes 
source:

Faculty of Business  
 Bachelor of Business Administration (Chinese)
 International Business Cohort

Faculty of Data Science  
 Bachelor of Intelligence Technology and Services (Chinese)

Faculty of Finance  
 Bachelor of Applied Economics (Chinese)

Faculty of Humanities and Social Sciences
 Bachelor of Social Sciences (Chinese)
 Bachelor of Social Work
 Bachelor of Arts in English (English)
 Bachelor of Arts in Portuguese (Portuguese)

Faculty of Innovation and Design  
 Bachelor of Arts in Design

Faculty of International Tourism and Management
 Bachelor of International Tourism and Hotel Management (Chinese)
 Bachelor of Service Industry Management (Chinese)
 Bachelor of International Tourism and Hotel Management (English)

Master's Degree Programmes 
source:

Faculty of Business 
 Master of Business Administration (Chinese)

Faculty of Data Science
 Master of Data Science (Chinese)

Faculty of Finance  
 Master of Science in Finance (Chinese)

Faculty of Humanities and Social Sciences
 Master of Cultural Industries Management (Chinese)
 Master of Applied Psychology
 Master of Social Work (Chinese)

Faculty of Innovation and Design  
 Master of Urban Planning and Design (Chinese)
 Master of Fine Arts (Chinese)
 Master of Design (Chinese)

Faculty of International Tourism and Management
 Master of International Hospitality and Tourism Management (Chinese)
 Master of International Hotel Management (Chinese)
 Master of International Hospitality and Tourism Management (English)
 Master of International Hotel Management (English)

School of Education  
 Master of Education (Chinese)
 Master of Teaching and Learning Studies (Chinese)

School of Law  
 Master of Law (Chinese)

Institute for Research on Portuguese-Speaking Countries  
 Master of Arts in Portuguese-Speaking Countries Studies (Chinese)

Doctoral Degree Programmes 
source:

Faculty of Business
 Doctor of Business Administration (Chinese)

Faculty of Data Science 
 Doctor of Philosophy in Data Science (Chinese)

Faculty of Finance
 Doctor of Philosophy in Finance (Chinese)

Faculty of Humanities and Social Sciences
 Doctor of Applied Psychology
 Doctor of Philosophy in Cultural Industry Studies (Chinese)

Faculty of Innovation and Design
 Doctor of Urban Planning and Design (Chinese)
 Doctor of Philosophy in Arts Studies (Chinese)
 Doctor of Philosophy in Design (Chinese)

Faculty of International Tourism and Management
 Doctor of Philosophy in International Tourism Management (Chinese)
 Doctor of Philosophy in International Tourism Management (English)

School of Education
 Doctor of Philosophy in Education (Chinese)

Institute for Research on Portuguese-Speaking Countries
 Doctor of Philosophy in Portuguese-Speaking Countries Studies

See also
 Education in Macau

References

External links
 City University of Macau

Universities in Macau
1981 establishments in Macau
Educational institutions established in 1981